This is a list of games that supported the online functionality of the Sony PlayStation 2 video game console. Many games have been brought back due to servers run and operated by fans such as PS2Online and the SOCOM Community server.

Released Games

Notes
1: Only the NTSC-J version of Resident Evil: Outbreak and its sequel have been restored for online play. English versions are currently not supported and still shut down.

LAN games
PlayStation 2 LAN titles can be played online using the XLink Kai service. Some games only had LAN play available in specific regions.

i.Link Games
Age of Empires II: The Age of Kings (PAL regions)
Armored Core 2
Armored Core 2: Another Age
Armored Core 3
Armored Core: Last Raven
Armored Core: Nexus
Armored Core: Nine Breaker
ATV Offroad Fury 2 (North America only)
Battle Gear 2 (Japan only, same game as Tokyo Road Race)
Gran Turismo 3: A-Spec
Gran Turismo Concept 2002 Tokyo-Geneva
Lethal Skies II
Silent Line: Armored Core
Silent Scope 2: Dark Silhouette
TimeSplitters 2
Time Crisis II
Time Crisis 3
Tokyo Road Race (PAL regions same game as Battle Gear 2)
Unreal Tournament (North America only)
Wangan Midnight

References

2 online games